The IAIO Toufan or Toophan is series of combat helicopters by the Iran Aviation Industries Organization. Based on the US-built AH-1J SeaCobra, the Toufan has two variants, the Toufan I unveiled in May 2010 and the improved Toufan II unveiled in January 2013.

Design
The aircraft incorporates  a new laser system, a rocket-launch digital control system, a multi-display monitor, and a central smart arms management system.

Operators

 Iranian Army
 IRGC

See also

References

External links

 Video of IAIO Toufan

Iranian attack aircraft
Military helicopters